The Birkmyre Baronetcy, of Dalmunzie in the County of Perth, is a title in the Baronetage of the United Kingdom. It was created on 29 January 1921 for Sir Archibald Birkmyre. He was a senior partner in the firm of Birkmyre Brothers, jute spinners, of Calcutta, and a member of the Viceroy of India's Legislative Council. As of 2007 the title is held by his great-grandson, the fourth Baronet, who succeeded his father in 2001.

Birkmyre baronets, of Dalmunzie (1921)
Sir Archibald Birkmyre, 1st Baronet (1875–1935)
Sir Henry Birkmyre, 2nd Baronet (1898–1992)
Sir Archibald Birkmyre, 3rd Baronet (1923–2001)
Sir James Birkmyre, 4th Baronet (born 1956)

References

Birkmyre